Heteranthera reniformis common name kidneyleaf mud-plantain, and mud plantain; is a plant found in North America. It is listed as a special concern and believed extirpated in Connecticut. It listed as endangered in Illinois and Ohio.

Native American ethnobotany
The Cherokee apply a hot poultice of the root to inflamed wounds and sores.

References

Plants used in traditional Native American medicine
Pontederiaceae